"Coming Up" is a song written and performed by English musician Paul McCartney, released as the opening track on his 1980 solo album McCartney II. Like other songs on the album, the song has a synthesised sound, featuring sped-up vocals created by using a vari-speed tape machine. McCartney played all instruments.

In the United States and Canada, the live version of the song performed by Paul McCartney and Wings in Glasgow the year prior (released as the B-side to the single) saw greater success.

Background
In a Rolling Stone interview, McCartney explained how the song came about:

John Lennon described "Coming Up" as "a good piece of work" and it prompted him to return to recording in 1980. After hearing it on the radio for the first time, Lennon reportedly stated “Fuck a pig! It’s Paul!” Lennon later stated his preference for the studio version over the live version that was released as a single: "I thought that Coming Up was great and I like the freak version that he made in his barn better than that live Glasgow one. If I'd have been with him I would've said 'that's the one' too. And I thought that the record company had a nerve changing it round on him, and I know what they mean, they want to hear the real guy singing, but I like the freaky one."

Cash Box called it an "unusually produced but cute track". Record World said that "electronic keyboards, a dance beat and Paul's pop vocals give the contemporary sound."

Live version
A live version of the song was recorded in Glasgow, Scotland, on 17 December 1979 by Wings during their tour of the UK. An edited version from the performance was included as one of two songs on the B-side; the other song on the B-side was "Lunchbox/Odd Sox", a Wings song that dated back to Venus and Mars. Both songs were credited to Paul McCartney and Wings.

Columbia Records wanted to put the live version on McCartney II but McCartney resisted the change, wanting to keep it a solo album. Instead, a one-sided 7" white-label promotional copy of the Wings version was included with the album in North America.

"Coming Up (Live at Glasgow)" has since appeared on the US versions of the McCartney compilations All the Best! (1987) and Wingspan: Hits and History (2001), while the solo studio version is included on UK and international releases.

The full length version of the song with an additional verse from the 1979 Glasgow show was finally released as bonus track on the Paul McCartney Archive Collection reissue of McCartney II in 2011.

A different live Wings recording of "Coming Up" appears on the album Concerts for the People of Kampuchea, also recorded in 1979.

Music video
The music video for "Coming Up", directed by Keith McMillan, features Paul McCartney playing ten roles (himself, two guitarists, a bassist, a drummer, a keyboard player, and four saxophone players) and Linda McCartney playing two (one female backing singer and one male backing singer). The "band" identified as "The Plastic Macs" on the drum kit (a homage to Lennon's conceptual Plastic Ono Band), features Paul and Linda's imitations of various rock musician stereotypes, as well as a few identifiable musicians.

In his audio commentary on the 2007 video collection The McCartney Years, McCartney identified characters that were impersonations of specific artists: Hank Marvin (guitarist from the Shadows), Ron Mael of Sparks (keyboards), a 'Beatlemania-era' version of himself (bass), and a drummer vaguely inspired by John Bonham from Led Zeppelin. Others, such as authors Fred Bronson and Kenneth Womack, have suggested that there are other identifiable impersonations in the video, such as Andy Mackay, Frank Zappa and Buddy Holly; McCartney said the other roles were simply comic relief.

The video premiered in the UK on The Kenny Everett Video Show on 14 April 1980 and in the US on Saturday Night Live on 17 May 1980.

Release
In the UK, the single was an immediate hit, reaching  in its third week on the chart.

In the US, Columbia Records promoted the live version, which subsequently received more airplay than the studio version. McCartney was unaware of Columbia's move; otherwise, he might have pushed for the A-side, which he thought was the stronger version. An executive from Columbia Records explained the switch by stating "Americans like the sound of Paul McCartney's real voice." The live version reached  on the Billboard Hot 100 and was certified gold by the Recording Industry Association of America for sales of over one million copies.

Chart performance

Weekly charts

Year-end charts

All-time charts

Certifications

Track listing
7" single (R 6035)
 "Coming Up" – 3:49
 "Coming Up" (Live at Glasgow) – 3:51
 Performed by Paul McCartney & Wings
 "Lunch Box/Odd Sox" – 3:54
 Performed by Paul McCartney & Wings

Personnel

Studio version
 Paul McCartney – lead vocals, keyboards, guitar, bass, drums
 Linda McCartney - Backup Vocals

Live version
Paul McCartney – lead vocals, bass
Linda McCartney – keyboards, vocals
Denny Laine – guitar, vocals
Laurence Juber – guitar
Steve Holley – drums
Tony Dorsey – trombone
Thaddeus Richard – saxophone
Howie Casey – saxophone
Steve Howard – trumpet

"Lunch Box / Odd Sox"
Paul McCartney – piano
Linda McCartney – moog synthesizer
Denny Laine – guitar
Geoff Britton – drums
Tony Dorsey – bass

See also
 List of Billboard Hot 100 number-one singles of 1980

References

1980 songs
1980 singles
Billboard Hot 100 number-one singles
Columbia Records singles
Music published by MPL Music Publishing
Parlophone singles
Paul McCartney songs
RPM Top Singles number-one singles
Song recordings produced by Paul McCartney
Songs written by Paul McCartney
Paul McCartney and Wings songs
Funk rock songs